Thomas Davies (1872 – 1950s) was a Welsh amateur footballer who played at half back for Druids for twenty years around the turn of the twentieth century. He also made four appearances for the Welsh national team.

Football career
Davies was one of five brothers from Cefn Mawr who played for the local Druids side, then one of the top teams in Wales. He was a stalwart of the Druids side between 1890 and 1910 and later became a member of the club committee. He had a reputation for  strength and fitness and is reputed to have never left the field of play as a result of injury; he put his longevity down to "the entire abstention from tobacco and alcoholic drinks".

Despite being only a few inches over 5 feet tall, Davies was described as a "glutton for work"; the England international, C.B. Fry commented that he was "astonished to find a man of such diminutive stature capable of so much effective work".

During his Druids career, Davies played in five Welsh Cup finals, being on the winning side in 1898, 1899 and 1904 and finishing as runners-up in 1900 and 1901.

Davies made his international debut for Wales in a 2–1 defeat by England at Portsmouth's Fratton Park on 2 March 1903 and retained his place for the next two matches, a 1–0 defeat by Scotland and a 2–0 defeat by Ireland. His fourth and final international appearance was in a 1–1 draw with Scotland on 12 March 1904.

Career outside football
Davies spent most of his working life at the Ruabon Brick and Terracotta Works.

Family
Three of his brothers also played for Wales: Joe (7 appearances), Lloyd (16 appearances) and Robert (1 appearance).

Honours
Druids
Welsh Cup winners: 1898, 1899 and 1904
Welsh Cup finalists: 1900 and 1901

References

External links

1872 births
1950s deaths
People from Ruabon
Sportspeople from Wrexham County Borough
Welsh footballers
Wales international footballers
Association football midfielders
Druids F.C. players